Nervión is an underground station of the Seville Metro on the line 1. The station is located at the intersection of the avenues of Eduardo Dato and San Fco. Javier, in the neighborhood of Nervión. Nervión station is located between San Bernardo and Gran Plaza stations on the same line. The station was opened on 2 April 2009.

See also
 List of Seville metro stations

References

External links 
  Official site.
 History, construction details and maps.

Seville Metro stations
Railway stations in Spain opened in 2009